WSHY (1410 AM) is a commercial radio station in Lafayette, Indiana.  It broadcasts a conservative talk radio format.   WSHY is owned by Star City Broadcasting (a joint venture between Waypoint Media and Vision Communications) as part of a cluster with Fox/NBC affiliate WPBI-LD, ABC affiliate WPBY-LD, and sister radio stations WBPE, WYCM and WAZY-FM. All six stations share studios and offices at 3824 South 18th Street in Lafayette, with WSHY's transmitter also located at the site.

WSHY broadcasts at a power of 1,000 watts during daytime hours and 60 watts at night.  The station uses a directional antenna with a two-tower array  Programming is also heard on 99 watt FM translator W282CJ at 104.3 MHz. 

On weekdays, WSHY carries mostly nationally syndicated conservative talk programs:  Hugh Hewitt, Clay Travis & Buck Sexton, Sean Hannity, Jesse Kelly, Dave Ramsey, Dennis Prager and Mike Gallagher.  Hourly news updates are provided by Townhall Radio News.

History
On , the station first signed on the air as WAZY.  WAZY was joined by FM sister station WAZY-FM on October 1, 1964. Both radio stations were owned by WAZY Radio Inc., J.Edward "Ed" Willis was Owner, President and General Manager.

On March 1, 1970, ownership of both radio stations transferred to Radio Lafayette, Inc.  Radio Lafayette was a subsidiary of the Peoria Journal Star newspaper, based in Peoria, Illinois.  F. Patrick Nugent served as vice president and general manager.  The stations simulcast a Top 40 format on both AM and FM. 

By 1978, WAZY-FM had moved from the original 96.7 mHz frequency to 96.5 mHz, with a resulting increase in power from 3,000 watts to 50,000 watts. By 1980, WAZY-AM was being programmed separately from WAZY-F.  WAZY broadcast a middle of the road (MOR) format, with popular adult music, news and sports.

Lightfoot Broadcasting acquired WAZY, switching the call sign to WFTE on January 7, 1982. The format shifted from MOR to Country music. The station also aired Notre Dame Fighting Irish football games during this period.

On July 4, 1984, ownership of WFTE was transferred from Lightfoot Broadcasting to Lafayette's First Assembly of God Church.  As a result, the format was flipped to Contemporary Christian music with some Christian talk and teaching programs.  The call letters switched to WCFY (We Care For You).

Artistic Media Partners acquired WCFY on September 30, 1998. Call letters were changed back to WAZY and the station launched with a News/talk format, which brought the format back to Lafayette 7 months after crosstown stations WASK-AM/FM dropped the format in favor of oldies.

As a talk station, "News/talk 1410 WAZY" carried programs such as Rush Limbaugh, Dr. Laura, and Jim Rome.  The station also carried a short-lived local talk program hosted by Rick Mummey.  A live audio feed of CNN Headline News covered all other dayparts.

The news/talk format was short-lived.  It lasted a little less than 2 years with low ratings.  In 1999, the format was dropped and 1410 kHz began simulcasting WAZY-FM's hot adult contemporary format.  In 2000, the simulcast with WAZY-FM was dropped and the station began simulcasting WGBD's alternative rock format.

Later that year, in September 2000, the station broke away from WGBD's simulcast to run an Adult standards format via Westwood One.  A year later, 1410 WAZY changed network affiliations, but remained adult standards with Jones Radio Network's "Music of Your Life."  In August 2002, the call sign changed to WLAS, but the format remained for about a month before the station flipped to a full-time simulcast of Artistic Media Partner's country outlet, WLFF, now WBPE.

On May 3, 2007, WLAS changed call letters to WSHY and on December 6, 2007, the format was flipped to adult hits, simulcast with WLFF.

In August 2008, a local investment group headed by media host Jeff Holmes started a local marketing agreement (LMA) of the frequency.  This returned the news/talk format back to the Lafayette market after a 10-year hiatus.  "Newstalk 1410 WSHY" signed on in late September 2008 after stunting with C-SPAN Radio.  Programs heard on the station at the time included Imus in the Morning, Glenn Beck, Rush Limbaugh, Sean Hannity, Dennis Miller, Jim Bohannon, and George Noory.  Newstalk 1410 also aired an hour of local talk programming in the afternoon drive initially hosted by Holmes called "The L-Town Hour" as well as a weekend oldies show.  In 2009 while maintaining the talk format, the station's name was tweaked to "Fox 1410" due to an affiliation with Fox News Radio.

After only a year, the format and the LMA agreement were dropped and WSHY returned to the hands of Artistic Media Partners.  At this point, WSHY's programming returned to a 24-hour-a-day simulcast of FM sister station, WBPE, "95.3 BOB FM."  The simulcast was broken precisely at the top of each hour for station identification and throughout the year for Purdue University women's volleyball, baseball, and softball broadcasts.  Through the simulcast of WBPE, WSHY also carried Purdue University women's basketball.

On April 1, 2013 WSHY split from its simulcast of WBPE 95.3 and changed the format to sports radio, branded as "Fox Sports 1410" and carrying the Fox Sports Radio Network.

Artistic Media Partners sold its Lafayette stations to Star City Broadcasting, owner of WPBI-LD (channel 16), in 2016. The transfer to Lafayette TV, LLC was completed on January 3, 2017.

On July 23, 2018, WSHY changed its format from sports to news/talk, branded as "104.3 The Patriot," simulcast on FM translator W282CJ 104.3 MHz.

Sister station WGGO in Salamanca, New York shared WSHY's programming lineup and branding from 2019 to 2021, with local commercials and weather forecasts inserted. WENI in Corning, New York and WENY in Elmira were added to the simulcast in 2020, but all three stations dropped the simulcast with WSHY in September 2021 when the stations were dispersed, WSHY to Coastal Television, WGGO to The Station of the Cross, and WENY and WENI to Seven Mountains Media.

See also
 WAZY

References

External links
FCC History Cards for WSHY

SHY
News and talk radio stations in the United States
Conservative talk radio
Radio stations established in 1959
1959 establishments in Indiana
Waypoint Media